Crookham is a village on the River Till in Northumberland, in England. It has three farms, Crookham Sandyford, Crookham Eastfield, and Crookham Westfield. Recorded as "Crucum" in 1244, the village name derived from the Old English for "Settlement at the Bend" (of the River Till).

History 
The poet Robert Story was educated for some time at Crookham.

The Till Valley Archaeological Society holds meetings and events in Crookham Village Hall. The Society's aim is to promote the archaeology, heritage, and history of the Till Valley. Its members take part as volunteers in archaeological excavations and field walking in north Northumberland, most notably on or around the site of the Battle of Flodden.

Landmarks 
Crookham contains a coach house and a post office.

References

External links

Northumberland Communities (Accessed: 6 November 2008)

Villages in Northumberland
Ford, Northumberland